Pigeon Island Anchorage is a passage through a reef that runs along the northwest wide of Pigeon Island in the Wallabi Group of the Houtman Abrolhos, an archipelago off the coast of Western Australia. Pigeon Island is seasonally populated by a great many Western Rock Lobster fishers, and Pigeon Island Anchorage represents the only safe approach to the island. It is thus heavily used as both a navigational passage and as an anchorage.

Arriving at the group in search of survivors of the  shipwreck, it entered the passage, anchoring off Barge Rock in order to land a party of men on East Wallabi Island.

References

Houtman Abrolhos